The Douglas & Jarvis Patent Parabolic Truss Iron Bridge is a historic bridge across the Missisquoi River in Highgate, Vermont.  Located at the end of Mill Hill Road, it is at  one of the longest bridges of its type in the northeastern United States.  It was built in 1887, and was listed on the National Register of Historic Places in 1974.

Description and history
The Douglas & Jarvis Patent Parabolic Truss Iron Bridge stands south of Highgate Falls village, at the end of Mill Hill Road, where it formerly crossed the Missisquoi River to meet Highgate Road (Vermont Route 207). The bridge is oriented east-west across the river, just downstream (north of) the dam at Highgate Falls, and is open to pedestrian use. It is of a parabolic or lenticular truss design, with a secondary lenticular pony truss span at its southern end. The main trusses are supported by iron I-beam portal posts topped by decorative finials, and are joined to each other by a web of overhead iron rods.

The bridge was built in 1887 by the Berlin Iron Bridge Company of Berlin, Connecticut, which held rights to the Douglas and Jarvis patent for the lenticular truss design.  The bridge was one of the first to be built in the state with state-assisted local funding, and is one of the largest surviving lenticular truss bridges in the northeastern United States.  The company built many instances of this design in the late 19th century, but gradually phased out its use in the early 20th century.

See also
 
 
 
 National Register of Historic Places listings in Franklin County, Vermont
 National Register of Historic Places listings in Vermont

References

Bridges on the National Register of Historic Places in Vermont
National Register of Historic Places in Franklin County, Vermont
Bridges completed in 1887
Bridges in Franklin County, Vermont
Buildings and structures in Highgate, Vermont
Pedestrian bridges in Vermont
Truss bridges in the United States
Iron bridges in the United States
1887 establishments in Vermont